SS Selma was an oil tanker built in 1919 by F.F. Ley and Company, Mobile, Alabama. President Woodrow Wilson approved the construction of 24 concrete vessels of which only 12 were actually completed.

SS Selma is the only permanent, and prominent, wreck along the Houston Ship Channel. It lies approximately one mile north of Galveston Island.

Construction and career
Steel shortages during World War I led the US to build experimental concrete ships, the largest of which was the SS Selma, today partially submerged in Galveston Bay and visible from both the Houston Ship Channel and Seawolf Park.

SS Selma was built in Mobile, Alabama, and named to honor Selma, Alabama, for its successful wartime liberty loan drive. The ship was launched on June 28, 1919, the same day Germany signed the Treaty of Versailles, officially ending World War I. As a result, the 7,500-ton ship never served during the war. Instead she was placed into service as an oil tanker in the Gulf of Mexico.

On May 31, 1920, the Selma hit a jetty in Tampico, Mexico, ripping a 60 foot hole in her hull. After attempts to repair the ship in Galveston failed and efforts to sell the ship proved unsuccessful, US officials decided to intentionally scuttle the ship. A channel 1,500 feet long and 25 feet deep was dug to a point just off Pelican Island's eastern shoreline where on March 9, 1922, the ship was laid to rest. The wreck of the Selma has since been the object of failed plans to convert it for use as a fishing pier, pleasure resort, and an oyster farm. Long a source of curiosity and local legend, it remains important to scientists who continue to study aspects of its concrete construction.

A. Pat Daniels (1917-2011), a long time Texas journalist, historian, and book author, purchased the ship in 1990 from Novie Brown (Hargett) when he and his wife, Shirley Oakes Daniels discovered that it had been privately owned since 6 days after the government scuttled her. Daniels said in his 2011 book titled "Strange Saga of the SS Selma" that he first became aware of the Selma in 1939, when, after leaving the University of Texas (he was the Editor of the Daily Texan and the roommate of John Connally in 1939) he became a cub reporter on the Galveston Daily News. Daniels said that during many sightseeing trips on the Bolivar Ferry, he would see the SS Selma in the distance and became enchanted and possibly fell in love with it. He said because of his interest in Texas history sharpened by 25 years as a member of the Harris County Historical Commission, he liked the idea of owning a piece of Texas history, and to have the Selma recognized for its historical importance. Through Daniels' efforts, the SS Selma is listed on the National Register of Historic Places, recognized on an Official Texas Historical Commission Marker located on nearby Pelican Island, had it become a Texas State Archeological Landmark and the official flagship of the Texas Army. After Mr. Daniels passed in 2011, complete title of the ship was transferred to a long time friend, William R. Cox, who helped Mr. Daniels put the SS Selma into a corporate name to help protect him from a potential liability lawsuit. After Mr. Cox passed in 2015, ownership of the SS Selma passed to his son, Mr. Ken Cox. Another good friend of Mr. Daniels, Mr. Jim Saye, helped him have an annual party for the SS Selma for over 25 years on Galveston Island that has been attended by hundreds of people over the years with music provided by the Over the Hill Gang of Houston.

See also

National Register of Historic Places listings in Galveston County, Texas
SS Palo Alto

References

Rob Bender - Concrete Ships - http://www.concreteships.org - 6/23/2011
Texas Historical Commission - http://atlas.thc.state.tx.us/viewform.asp?atlas_num=5167011567&site_name=SS+Selma&class=5000

External links
S.S. Selma article on CrystalBeach.com - http://www.crystalbeach.com/selma.htm
S.S. Selma article on ConcreteShips.org - http://www.concreteships.org/ships/ww1/selma/

Design 1100 tankers
Concrete ships
Ships built in Mobile, Alabama
1919 ships
Oil tankers
Ships sunk as breakwaters